Dorcadion zenete is a species of beetle in the family Cerambycidae. It was described by Anichtchenko and Verdugo in 2004. It is known from Spain.

See also 
Dorcadion

References

zenete
Beetles described in 2004